Charles "Chuck" Shamata (born 1942) is a Canadian actor.

Early life and education 
Born and raised in Toronto, he worked at Honest Ed's, and studied acting at Toronto Metropolitan University.

Career 
Shamata had stage roles and bit parts in film and television, before his breakthrough role in the 1969 television film Dulcima, as the love interest of Jackie Burroughs' title character. His later roles included the films Between Friends (1973), Death Weekend (1976), Welcome to Blood City (1977), Power Play (1978), I Miss You, Hugs and Kisses (1978), Stone Cold Dead (1979) and Running (1979), and guest appearances in the television series The Mod Squad, Police Surgeon, Baretta and The Littlest Hobo. In 1980 he appeared alongside Earl Pennington and Marcel Sabourin in The Mounties, Stuart Gillard's pilot for a proposed comedy series about the Royal Canadian Mounted Police, but the show was not picked up to series.

In 1981 he played the lead role in The Running Man, an episode of the CBC Television anthology series For the Record which was the first LGBT-themed television film ever to air in Canada. He won the award for Best Actor in a Non-Feature at the Bijou Awards for his performance.

Through the 1980s, he continued to appear in films such as The Devil and Max Devlin (1981), The Terry Fox Story (1983), Hyper Sapien: People from Another Star (1986), Nowhere to Hide (1987), Night Friend (1987) and Martha, Ruth and Edie (1988), and in television series such as Seeing Things, Joshua Then and Now, Sylvanian Families, Katts and Dog, Street Legal and Night Heat. In the 1990s, he appeared in films such as Princes in Exile (1990), Death Wish V: The Face of Death (1994) and Virus (1996), and on television in Bordertown, E.N.G., Due South, Traders and Wind at My Back.

In 2005, Shamata appeared as Det. Henry Messina in the short-lived Ving Rhames revival of Kojak. His most recent roles have included a regular voice role as Uncle Cheech in Fugget About It, the films The Day After Tomorrow (2004), Cinderella Man (2005), The Sentinel (2006), Flash of Genius (2008), One Week (2008), Still Mine (2012), Clown (2014) and Miss Sloane (2016), and guest appearances in the television series Cracked, Beauty and the Beast and The Art of More.

Filmography

Film

Television

References

External links

1942 births
Canadian male film actors
Canadian male television actors
Canadian male voice actors
Canadian male stage actors
Male actors from Toronto
Canadian people of Italian descent
Canadian people of Lebanese descent
Living people
Canadian Screen Award winners